Collins Foods Limited is a publicly-listed Australian company focused in restaurant operations. It either operates or franchises restaurants from three brands — Sizzler, KFC and Taco Bell — in Australia, Germany, the Netherlands, Thailand and Japan. It previously owned the US-based Sizzler restaurants (until 2011), Snag Stand in Australia (until 2017), and was the majority-owner of the Pat & Oscar's in the US (until 2009).

History 
United States national, James Collins, founded Collins Foods International in Culver City, California, in 1968 after multiple meetings with Colonel Sanders and acquiring the Sizzler brand in 1967. Collins Foods International was a publicly traded American company with more than 240 Sizzler and KFC stores in the United States and Australia.

Collins Foods International began selling off 209 United States-based KFC stores to PepsiCo in 1990. The sale was completed in 1991 for a total of US$123 million. The company was renamed as Sizzler International as efforts were increasingly focused on its Sizzler business. In 2001, the company was renamed as Worldwide Restaurant Concepts.

In 2005, Worldwide Restaurant Concepts was acquired by Australian private equity firm, Pacific Equity Partners (PEP) for about US$208 million is cash. PEP owned 52% of Worldwide Restaurant Concepts with the remaining 48% owned by company management. As a result, the company headquarters moved from California to Brisbane, Australia. After the merger it was renamed as Collins Foods.

In 2011, Pacific Equity Partners offered its share of Collins Foods to an IPO, ending PEP's ownership of the company.

In July 2020, Drew O'Malley took over as CEO following Graham Maxwell's retirement.

Sizzler 

In the 1980s, the company's Sizzler business was struggling financially as popularity with the general public dipped. Sizzler appointed Thomas L. Gregory as president and CEO of the chain during this time. The Sizzler brand underwent changes in menu selection and customer experience, which proved to help bolster the brand's profitability. Based on these results, Collins Foods International expanded further into Asia in 1992.

In the mid-1990s Sizzler International was expanding aggressively in the Pacific region; however, domestic sales began to return with losses. In 1996, after debts reached approximately US$100 million, the company filed for chapter 11 bankruptcy protection. After some major restructuring and paying approximately US$70 million to creditors claims, Sizzler International recovered from the bankruptcy.

In 2006, all 28 Sizzler restaurants across Australia temporarily suspended salad bar service after rat poison was found in two Brisbane Sizzler restaurants. Sizzler Australia referred to the incidents as sabotage.  The culprit turned out to be a woman described as being mentally unstable.

In February 2008, PEP put Sizzler up for sale.  In 2011, Sizzler USA acquired all Sizzler restaurants based in the United States.

In the 2013 financial year, Collins Foods reported stalling revenue for their Sizzler operations in Australia, blaming the downturn of the casual dining sector in the country. In June 2015, Collins Foods wrote down the value of Sizzler by AU$37.5 million. In an investors meeting by Collins Foods, CEO Graham Maxwell states: "We no longer consider Sizzler to be a strategic growth prospect in Australia and therefore we will not be investing further capital". At the time of fiscal announcement in 2015, Collins had 26 company-owned Sizzler restaurants across Australia and 61 franchised Sizzler restaurants around Asia. Collins Foods began to close a limited number of Sizzler restaurants in Australia, with greater focus directed to their KFC operations. Meanwhile, Sizzler operations in Asia continued to thrive, with further expansion plans in China.

In 2016, Collins Foods had operated 21 Sizzler restaurants in Australia, a decrease of two stores compared to financial year 2016. Collins Foods had operated 65 Sizzler restaurants in Asia during the same year, an increase of 5 stores compared to the previous financial year. An additional two stores in Asia were planned for financial year 2017.

In 2020, Collins Foods closed its six remaining Sizzler stores in China due to the impact of the COVID-19 pandemic. In October 2020, Collins Foods announced that it would be closing all nine remaining Australian Sizzler restaurants by 15 November 2020, citing the impact of the COVID-19 pandemic on revenues. Collins Foods said of the three restaurant brands that it operates, Sizzler had been hardest hit by the COVID-19 pandemic. Although Collins had closed all company-owned restaurants in 2020, Collins continues to license the use of the Sizzler restaurant brand for use in Thailand and Japan.

KFC 
In November 2013, Collins Foods acquired the 44 KFC restaurants (40 in Western Australia and 4 in the Northern Territory) owned by Competitive Foods Australia for $55.6 million. In May 2016 Collins Foods further acquired 13 KFC restaurants in New South Wales and Victoria.

As of November 2016 Collins Foods operates 190 KFC stores in Australia: 132 in Queensland, four in the Northern Territory, 41 in Western Australia and two in New South Wales. An additional 5 to 6 stores are planned for financial year 2017. In June 2017, Collins Foods acquired 28 KFC stores in Tasmania, South Australia and Western Australia from Yum! Brands for $110.2 million.

On 31 October 2016 Collins Foods announced that its German subsidiary, Collins Foods Germany, entered into a binding agreement to acquire 11 KFC restaurants in Stuttgart and Düsseldorf, Germany for €12.7 million (A$18.4 million). This occurred in the wake of KFC Germany's plans to increase its store count from 140 to 300 stores in the next few years. Completion of the acquisition is expected to occur in December 2016. Collins Foods plans to open four to five new KFC restaurants per year in Germany for financial years 2017 to 2018.

In March 2017, Collins Foods expanded into the Netherlands with the purchase of 16 KFC stores from subsidiaries of Yum! Brands for €62.3 million (A$87.8 million). As part of the deal, Collins Foods also entered into a development agreement to open more than 20 KFC stores in the country by the end of 2021.

, Collins Foods operates 240 KFC restaurants in Australia, 17 in Germany, and 23 in the Netherlands.

Taco Bell 
On 6 September 2018, Collins Foods announced that it has purchased the franchise rights to Taco Bell in Australia. Collins now has plans to roll out 50 Taco Bell stores across Australia over the next 5 years.

, Collins Foods operates 12 Taco Bell restaurants in Australia.

Former brands

Pat & Oscar's 
In May 2000, Sizzler International announced it would purchase an 82% stake in the Oscar's restaurant chain for $21 million in cash and stock. The chain was later renamed as Pat & Oscar's. In January 2009, the management team of Pat & Oscar's bought out the company.

Snag Stand 
In 2013, Collins Foods acquired a 50% equity stake in Snag Stand, a gourmet sausage chain founded in 2011 by businessperson Philip Blanco. In 2016, Collins Foods acquired the remaining 50% equity stake in Snag Stand, making the brand a wholly owned property.

Six Snag Stand outlets were operated in Australia: three in Queensland, two in New South Wales and one in the Australian Capital Territory. Collins Foods closed down all Snag Stand stores in 2017.

See also 
 Competitive Foods Australia

References

External links 
 
 Sizzler Australia

Companies based in Brisbane
Fast-food franchises
1968 establishments in the United States
Companies listed on the Australian Securities Exchange
KFC
Taco Bell